Meteor-M No.2 (also known as Meteor M2) was the second Russian Meteor-M series of polar-orbit weather satellite. It was launched on a Soyuz-2.1b rocket with a Fregat upper stage on 8 July 2014. It was designed to operate for 5 years.

See also

 Meteor

References

Spacecraft launched in 2014
Weather satellites of Russia
Spacecraft launched by Soyuz-2 rockets